Sp(l)it EP (also known as just Split) is a split EP between the hardcore/thrash band I Hate Sally and the thrash metal band GFK released in 2007 on CD and 7" vinyl.

Track listing
Side A - I Hate Sally
"Half Truth (A Thief)" - 2:42
"Show Me A Liar (A Liar)" - 2:35
"A Whole Lie (A Fool)" - 4:23
Side B - GFK
"As Said By..." - 2:19
"This Ain't A Love Song" - 1:53
"Relationships Of Power" - 2:03

References

GFK (band) albums
I Hate Sally albums
Split EPs
2007 EPs